Mount Pisgah is a peak rising to 1860 m in the north-central part of Imeon Range on Smith Island in the South Shetland Islands, Antarctica.  It is linked by Kostenets Saddle to Drinov Peak to the southwest, and surmounts Dalgopol Glacier to the north and Vetrino Glacier to the west.

Because the peaks of Smith Island gave it a forked appearance when seen from a distance, American sealers in the 1820s called it Mount Pisgah Island after the double-topped Mount Pisgah in the town of Durham, CT. The name has since been restricted to the peak described.

Location

Maps
Chart of South Shetland including Coronation Island, &c. from the exploration of the sloop Dove in the years 1821 and 1822 by George Powell Commander of the same. Scale ca. 1:200000. London: Laurie, 1822.
  L.L. Ivanov. Antarctica: Livingston Island and Greenwich, Robert, Snow and Smith Islands. Scale 1:120000 topographic map. Troyan: Manfred Wörner Foundation, 2010.  (First edition 2009. )
 South Shetland Islands: Smith and Low Islands. Scale 1:150000 topographic map No. 13677. British Antarctic Survey, 2009.
 Antarctic Digital Database (ADD). Scale 1:250000 topographic map of Antarctica. Scientific Committee on Antarctic Research (SCAR). Since 1993, regularly upgraded and updated.
 L.L. Ivanov. Antarctica: Livingston Island and Smith Island. Scale 1:100000 topographic map. Manfred Wörner Foundation, 2017.

See also
 Imeon Range
 Smith Island

References
 SCAR Composite Antarctic Gazetteer.

External links
 Mount Pisgah. Copernix satellite image

Mountains of Smith Island (South Shetland Islands)